Sam Van Rossom (born 3 June 1986) is a Belgian professional basketball player for Valencia of the Spanish Liga ACB and the EuroLeague. He also represents the Belgian national basketball team.

Early life
From the age of 6 until he was 16, Van Rossom played for Bobcat Gent, Gent United and Black Bears Gent.

Professional career
After playing for BBC De Pinte in the Belgian third and second division for three seasons, Van Rossom got a place on the roster of BC Oostende in 2005. In the 2007–08 season, he was a major contributor for Oostende as he averaged 11.5 points and 3.2 assists per game.

In 2008 Van Rossom signed with the Italian team Scavolini Pesaro. After two years in Italy, he moved to Spain to play for CAI Zaragoza. His contract was extended after his first season. In 2013, he signed a three-year contract with Valencia Basket.

In September 2017, he re-signed with Valencia for one more season. On 11 July 2020 Van Rossom renewed his contract for another year, with the option of an additional season.

International career
Van Rossom has played for the Belgian national basketball team since 2006. He represented Belgium at the EuroBasket 2015 where they lost to Greece in eighth finals with 75–54. Over 6 tournament games, he averaged 12.2 points, 3.7 rebounds and 4.5 assists on 43.5 shooting from the field.

Career statistics

EuroLeague

|-
| style="text-align:left;"| 2014–15
| style="text-align:left;"| Valencia
| 5 || 5 || 30.0 || .469 || .333 || .571 || 2.4 || 5.0 || 1.2 || .0 || 11.4 || 13.2
|- class="sortbottom"
| style="text-align:center;" colspan=2| Career
| 5 || 5 || 30.0 || .469 || .333 || .571 || 2.4 || 5.0 || 1.2 || .0 || 11.4 || 13.2

References

External links

Sam Van Rossom at acb.com
Sam Van Rossom at draftexpress.com
Sam Van Rossom at eurobasket.com
Sam Van Rossom at euroleague.net

1986 births
Living people
Basket Zaragoza players
BC Oostende players
Belgian expatriate basketball people in Italy
Belgian expatriate basketball people in Spain
Belgian men's basketball players
Belgium national basketball players
Lega Basket Serie A players
Liga ACB players
Point guards
Sportspeople from Ghent
Valencia Basket players
Victoria Libertas Pallacanestro players